Hemidactylus ruspolii, also known commonly as the farm leaf-toed gecko, Prince Ruspoli's gecko, Ruspoli's gecko, and the turnip-tailed black and yellow gecko,  is a species of lizard in the family Gekkonidae. The species is endemic to northern East Africa.

Etymology
The specific name, ruspolii, is in honor of Italian explorer Prince Eugenio Ruspoli.

Geographic range
H. ruspolii is found in Ethiopia, northern Kenya, and Somalia.

Reproduction
H. ruspolii is oviparous.

References

Further reading
Boulenger GA (1896). "A list of the Reptiles and Batrachians collected by the late Prince Eugenio Ruspoli in Somaliland and Gallaland in 1893". Annali del Museo Civico di Storia Naturale di Genova, Serie Seconda [Series 2] 17: 5–14. (Hemidactylus ruspolii, new species, pp. 6–7).
Rösler H (2000). "Kommentierte Liste der rezent, subrezent und fossil bekannten Geckotaxa (Reptilia: Gekkonomorpha)". Gekkota 2: 28–153. (Hemidactylus ruspolii, p. 87). (in German).
Spawls S, Howell K, Hinkel H, Menegon M (2018). Field Guide to East African Reptiles, Second Edition. London: Bloomsbury Natural History. 624 pp. . (Hemidactylus ruspolii, p. 96).
Steindachner F (1907). "Herpetologische Notizen III ". Anzeiger der Kaiserlichen Akademie der Wissenschaften, Mathematisch-Naturwissenschaftliche Klasse, Wien 27: 355–356. (Hemidactylus erlangeri, new species, p. 355). (in German).

Hemidactylus
Reptiles of Ethiopia
Reptiles of Kenya
Reptiles of Somalia
Reptiles described in 1896
Taxa named by George Albert Boulenger